Ram Puniyani (born 25 August 1945) is a former professor of biomedical engineering and former senior medical officer affiliated with the Indian Institute of Technology Bombay. He began his medical career in 1973 and served IIT in various capacities for 27 years, beginning in 1977. He has been involved with human rights activities and initiatives to oppose Hindu fundamentalism in India and is currently the President of the Executive Council of the Centre for Study of Society and Secularism (CSSS).

Activism 
He  is associated with various secular initiatives and has been part of various investigation reports on violation of human rights of minorities.
He has also served as part of an Indian People's Tribunal that investigated the violation of rights of minorities in the states of Orissa and Madhya Pradesh. 

He regularly conducts seminars and workshops on topics related to the threat of communal politics, human rights, values of secularism, the Uniform Civil Code debate, the partition tragedy, Kashmir Imbroglio and others. He is known for his articles and essays which regularly appear in Indian magazines and newspapers. He also runs a fortnightly e-bulletin Issues in Secular Politics.. He had been vocal for stopping the death sentence of Afzal Guru, a convict of the 2001 Indian Parliament Attacks, alleging that at worst Guru was facilitator in the crime and not a part of directly perpetrating the crime. On the other hand he advocates for investigation of 'Hindutva terror'.

In March 2019, men in plain clothes claiming to be from CID, asked about the whereabouts of his children. In early June 2019, he claimed that he received threatening phone calls from unknown persons who demanded that he stop his "anti-Hindu" activities and leave the country. Puniyani filed a report with the Mumbai Police.

Awards 
 Maharashtra Foundation (US) award for Social awareness about threat of Communal Politics 2002
 National Communal Harmony Award 2007
 NCHRO's Mukundan C.Menon award 2015

Works 
 Clinical Hemorheology: New Horizons (New Age International, 1996), 
 Applied Clinical Hemorheology (with Hideyuki Nimi, Quest Publications, 1998), 
 The Other Cheek: Minorities under Threat (Media House, 2000), 
 Second Assassination of Gandhi (University of Leicester, 2002), 
 Communalism: What is False: What is True (with Khalid Azam, Bombay Sarvoda Friendship Center, 2002)
 Communal Politics: Facts Versus Myths (2003), 
 Communalism: Illustrated Primer (Safdar Hashmi Memorial Trust and J&P Publications, 2004), 
 Hindu Extreme Right-Wing Groups : Ideology and Consequences (Media House, 2004), 
 Fascism of Sangh Parivar (Media House, 2004), 
 Religion, Power and Violence: Expression Of Politics In Contemporary Times, (SAGE, 2005), 
 Contours of Hindu Rashtra: Hindutva, Sangh Parivar And Contemporary Politics (Kalpaz, 2006), 
 Indian Democracy, Pluralism and Minorities (Global Media, 2006), 
 The Politics behind Anti-Christian Violence (compilation of investigation committee reports, Media House, 2006), 
 Terrorism: Facts versus Myths (Pharos Media, 2007), 
 Fundamentalism: Threat to Secular Democracy (eBook, IdeaIndia.com, 2007), ASIN B005D7FCYY
 Contemporary India: Overcoming Sectarianism: Terrorism (Hope India, 2008), 
 Communalism: India's Nemesis? (eBook, IdeaIndia.com, 2009), ASIN B005INISXU
 Dalit and Social Justice (Mythri Books, 2009)
 Mumbai" Post 26/11 - An Alternative Perspective (with Shabnam Hashmi, SAGE, 2010), 
 Deconstructing Communalism in India: Striving for Harmony (All India Secular Forum, 2010)
 Samajik Nyaya Ek Sachitra Parichay (in Hindi, Vani Prakashan, 2010), 9789350001479
 Communal Threat to Secular Democracy (Kalpaz, 2010), 
 Malegaon to Ajmer: The Trail of Terror (edited, All-India Secular Forum, 2010)
 Communalism Explained! A Graphic Account (with Sharad Sharma, Vani Prakashan, 2011)
 Making Sense of Ayodhya Verdict (co-edited with Asghar Ali Engineer, Vitasta Publishing, 2011), .
 God Politics (Vitasta Pub, 2012), 
 Sectarianism, Politics and Development (with Uday Mehta, Rawat, 2012), 
 Muslims in Indian Democracy (Kalpaz, 2013), 
 Quest for Social Justice: An Illustrated Primer (Arth Prakashan, 2013), ASIN B00J6AN412

 Tribute Volume For Dr. Asghar Ali Engineer Striving For Peace And Harmony (Bhashya Prakashan 2014), 
 Caste and Communalism (Mythri Books 2011), ASIN: B00HR1PB04
 Communalism & Anti Christian Violence (Mythri Books 2011), ASIN: B00HWWISMG
 Osama, America and Terrorism (Mythri Books 2012), ASIN: B00HWWIUP6
 Religion and Politics (Mythri Books 2009), ASIN: B00HWWMF7U
 Making of a Nation (Mythri Books 2012), ASIN: B00HWWMHWI
 Saampradaayiktaa (2011), 
 Aatankvaad Explained- A Graphics Account (Arth Prakashan 2013), 
 Mathaveri (Uyirmmai Pathippagam 2009)

References 

1945 births
Living people
Indian bioengineers
Writers from Nagpur
Academic staff of IIT Bombay
Indian secularists
Scientists from Nagpur
Indian religious writers
Indian political writers
20th-century Indian biologists
20th-century Indian non-fiction writers
Activists from Maharashtra